Leonard Insull (1883–1974) was Britain's leading ventriloquial figure maker of the twentieth century. He created many hundreds of items for Lewis Davenport Ltd.

Born in Wolverhampton, Insull trained as a joiner before entering showbusiness as a magician, "Hinsle, the Comedy Illusionist".  He worked with his son, also Leonard, to construct ventriloquist's dummies until his son's death in 1957. His noted figures include Lord Charles for Ray Alan and Archie Andrews for Peter Brough.

References

1883 births
Ventriloquism
1974 deaths
British puppeteers
British magicians
People from Wolverhampton
English puppeteers
English magicians